Sargocentron ensifer, or the yellow-striped squirrelfish, is a member of the family Holocentridae. It is native to the Pacific Ocean from southern Japan to New Caledonia, Hawaii and the Pitcairn Islands. It feeds on small fishes and crustaceans and can reach sizes of up to  SL, though a length of  TL is more common.

References

External links
 
 

ensifer
Fish described in 1859
Fish of the Pacific Ocean